Los Palacios is a municipality and town in the Pinar del Río Province of Cuba. It was founded in 1760.

Geography
The municipality is divided into the barrios of Limones, Macurijes, Paso Real, Santa Mónica, Santo Domingo, Sierra and Urbano.

Los Palacios Municipal Museum is located in the 21st street.

Demographics
In 2004, the municipality of Los Palacios had a population of 38,950.

See also
Los Palacios Municipal Museum
Municipalities of Cuba
List of cities in Cuba

References

External links

Populated places in Pinar del Río Province